Pakistan had a population of 213,222,917 according to the final results of the 2017 Census of Pakistan. This figure includes Pakistan's four provinces, Islamabad Capital Territory, Azad Kashmir, and Gilgit-Baltistan. Pakistan is the world's fifth-most populated country.

Between 1951 and 2017, Pakistan's population expanded over sixfold, going from 33.7 million to 207.7 million. The country has a relatively high, although declining, growth rate supported by high birth rates and low death rates. Between 1998 and 2017, the average annual population growth rate stood at +2.40%.

Dramatic social changes have led to urbanisation and the emergence of two megacities: Karachi and Lahore. The country's urban population more than tripled between 1981 and 2017 (from 23.8 million to 75.7 million), as Pakistan's urbanisation rate rose from 28.2% to 36.4%. Even with this, the nation's urbanisation rate remains one of the lowest in the world, and in 2017, over 130 million Pakistanis (making up nearly 65% of the population) lived in rural areas.

Due to a high fertility rate, estimated at 3.5 in 2022, Pakistan has one of the world's youngest populations. The 2017 census recorded that 40.3% of the country's population was under the age of 15, while only 3.7% of Pakistanis were aged 65 or more. The median age of the country was 19, while its sex ratio was recorded to be 105 males per 100 females.

The demographic history of Pakistan from the ancient Indus Valley civilisation to the modern era includes the arrival and settlement of many cultures and ethnic groups in the modern region of Pakistan from Eurasia and the nearby Middle East. Because of this, Pakistan has a multicultural, multilinguistic, and multiethnic society. Despite Urdu being Pakistan's lingua franca, estimates on how many languages are spoken in the country range from 75 to 85, and in 2017, the country's three largest ethnolinguistic groups were the Punjabis (making up 38.8% of the total population), the Pashtuns (18.2%), and the Sindhis (14.6%). Pakistan is also thought to have the world's fourth-largest refugee population, estimated at 1.4 million in mid-2021 by the UNHCR.

Population

The 2017 census recorded a population of 207,684,626 living in Pakistan's four provinces and the Islamabad Capital Territory. The census also reported that Azad Kashmir's population stood at 4,045,367 and Gilgit-Baltistan's population was 1,492,924. This meant that the total population of Pakistan in 2017 was 213,222,917.

The statistics in the graphs below were created by the United Nations in July 2022, and are covered in more detail in the following section. This data includes Azad Kashmir and Gilgit-Baltistan.

Estimates from the United Nations

In July 2022, the United Nations published its 2022 World Population Prospects, a biennially-updated database where key demographic indicators are estimated and projected worldwide down to the country level. They prepared estimates of Pakistan's population for every year from 1950 to 2021, as well as projections for future decades. This data includes Azad Kashmir and Gilgit-Baltistan.

Projections are highlighted in light yellow, and future figures are taken from the medium fertility variant.

Structure of population

The table below shows Pakistan's population structure by five-year age group and sex using data from the 2017 census. The country's population structure is relatively young, with a median age of 19. With low death rates and a declining birth rate, the country is in the third stage of its Demographic transition. In 2017, Pakistan's sex ratio stood at 105 males per 100 females, which is much more balanced than South Asia as a whole.

The statistics below do not contain Azad Kashmir or Gilgit-Baltistan, which disseminate their census data separately from Pakistan's four provinces and Islamabad.

Population distribution

Pakistan's population is distributed unevenly, with over half of the country's people living in the Punjab province. On the other hand, Balochistan, which is geographically Pakistan's largest province, is its least-populated. The population is mainly clustered around the most agriculturally fertile areas, particularly the Indus River and its tributaries. Most of the country's people live in rural areas, but two large and growing megacities exist: the coastal Karachi and Lahore in eastern Punjab. Numerous smaller cities (such as Faisalabad, Rawalpindi, Peshawar, and the capital Islamabad) dot the rest of the country.

By province

The table below shows Pakistan's provinces and territories by their historical population. While every one of Pakistan's administrative units currently has a growing population, the pace of growth is uneven throughout the country due to differing levels of fertility, mortality, as well as domestic and international migration. Populations pertaining to the modern borders of provinces are shown.

Urbanization

The following table shows how Pakistan has urbanised. As is true with population growth, urbanisation is an uneven and nonlinear process. With an urbanisation rate of 51.9% as of 2017, Sindh is the country's most urbanised province, and is even more urban than Islamabad Capital Territory. This is largely fuelled by the growth of Karachi, which economically dominates the province and attracts migrants from the rest of the country. On the other hand, the northwestern province of Khyber Pakhtunkhwa and the territory of Gilgit-Baltistan both share very low urbanisation rates of 16.5%.

Largest cities

As urbanisation has progressed and owing to the country's large population, Pakistan today has many very large urban centers which act as hubs for commerce and culture. The nation has two megacities, Karachi and Lahore. With populations of 14.9 million and 11.1 million respectively (in 2017), they are among the world's largest metropolises. The country also has seven more cities with more than 1 million residents each: Faisalabad, Rawalpindi, Gujranwala, Peshawar, Multan, Hyderabad, and Islamabad. All of them play a significant role in the country, housing nearly 14 million people altogether. Aside from these, there are 103 more cities in the country with populations of at least 100,000.

Below a list showing Pakistan's twenty largest cities as of the 2017 census can be found, which not only shows the current populations of the cities, but also their growth rates and locations. The full list can be found on the main article: List of cities in Pakistan by population.

All city population figures below include adjacent cantonments.

Vital statistics

As Pakistan lacks a national vital statistics system that publicly disseminates data, all of the following information is made from estimates, which are constantly being revised. The United Nations estimated that in February 2021, only 42% of births in Pakistan were officially registered, making it the world's most populous country where more than half of births remained unregistered. The United Nations was unable to estimate how many deaths were officially registered.

Estimates based on surveys

Surveys taken by the Pakistani government or intergovernmental organisations are seen as the most reliable method of keeping tabs on birth, death, fertility, and infant mortality rates in a country without a reliable vital registration system. The data recorded in these surveys is used by the United Nations in order to estimate historical and future fertility and mortality figures for Pakistan in the World Population Prospects.

Regional fertility rates

Many of the surveys above also recorded fertility rate data broken down by each of Pakistan's administrative units, while many more surveys have been taken explicitly focusing on a specific province or territory. The fertility rate data recorded in these surveys is displayed in the table below.

The MICS surveys above also provide data on the district level, although they come with a far higher margin of error. This margin of error is lessened for larger districts from where larger sample sizes were utilised. In the chart below, the latest fertility rate data for each Pakistani district with a population of over 2 million as of the 2017 census can be found. Although the table is originally ranked by district population size, clicking the headers will allow the reader to sort the table.

Estimates from the United Nations

In July 2022, the United Nations published its 2022 World Population Prospects, a biennially-updated database where key demographic indicators are estimated and projected worldwide down to the country level. They prepared the following estimates of demographic indicators in Pakistan for every year from 1950 to 2021, as well as projections for future decades. This data includes Azad Kashmir and Gilgit-Baltistan.

Human development

Human Development Index

Pakistan's Human Development Index (HDI) value for 2018 is in the medium human development category with a score of 0.560 (152nd rank out of 189 countries and territories) compared to 0.614 (135th rank) for Bangladesh and 0.647 (129th rank) for India. From 1990 to 2018, Pakistan's HDI increased 38.6% from 0.404 to 0.560.

2018 Information on Pakistani provinces/regions, compared to other countries, estimated at three decimal places is provided below:

Literacy
definition: aged 10 and over with the "Ability to read and understand simple text in any language from a newspaper or magazine, write a simple letter and perform basic mathematical calculation (ie, counting and addition/subtraction)." as of 2018
 Total population: 62.3%
 Male: 72.5%
 Female: 51.8%

Educational institutions by kind
 Primary schools: 156,592
 Middle schools: 320,611
 High schools: 23,964
 College of Arts and Sciences: 3,213
 Degree colleges: 1,202
 Technical and vocational institutions: 3,125
 Universities: 197

Nationality, ethnicity, and language

Ethnic groups

The major ethnolinguistic groups of Pakistan include Punjabis, Pashtuns, Sindhis, Saraikis, Muhajirs, Balochs, Paharis and Brahuis, with significant numbers of Kashmiris, Chitralis, Shina, Baltis, Kohistanis, Torwalis, Hazaras, Burusho, Wakhis, Kalash, Siddis and other various minorities.

Pakistan's census does not include the 1.4 million citizens of Afghanistan who are temporarily residing in Pakistan. Majority of them were born in Pakistan within the last four decades and are ethnically Pashtuns, Tajiks, Uzbeks and others.

Foreign-born population in Pakistan

After the independence of Pakistan in 1947, many Muslims from India migrated to Pakistan and they are the largest group of foreign-born residents. This group is dwindling because of its age. The second-largest group of foreign-born residents consists of refugees from Afghanistan who are expected to leave Pakistan by the end of 2018. There are also smaller groups of Muslim immigrants from countries such as Burma, Bangladesh, Iraq, Somalia, Iran, Tajikistan, and Uzbekistan, among others.

Languages

 Saraiki and Hindko was included with Punjabi in the 1951 and 1961 censuses.

Pakistan is a multilingual country with dozens of languages spoken as first languages. The majority Pakistan's languages belong to the Indo-Iranian group of the Indo-European language family.

Urdu is the national language and the lingua franca of Pakistan, and while sharing official status with English, it is the preferred and dominant language used for inter-communication between different ethnic groups. Numerous regional languages are spoken as first languages by Pakistan's various ethnolinguistic groups. Languages with more than a million speakers each include Punjabi, Pashto, Sindhi, Saraiki, Urdu, Balochi, Hindko, Pahari-Pothwari and Brahui.

Ethnologue lists 74 languages in Pakistan. Of these, 66 are indigenous and 8 are non-indigenous. In terms of their vitality, 7 are classified as 'institutional', 17 are 'developing', 37 are 'vigorous', 10 are 'in trouble', and 3 are 'dying'.

Urdu (national language) 

 Urdu is the national language and lingua franca of Pakistan. Although only about 7% of Pakistanis speak it as their first language, it is widely spoken and understood as a second language by the vast majority of Pakistanis.

No region in Pakistan uses Urdu as its mother tongue, though it is spoken as the first language of Muslim migrants (known as Muhajirs) in Pakistan who left India after independence in 1947. Urdu was chosen as a symbol of unity for the new state of Pakistan in 1947, because it had already served as a lingua franca among Muslims in north and northwest British India. It is written, spoken and used in all provinces/territories of Pakistan, and together with English as the main languages of instruction, although the people from differing provinces may have different native languages.

Urdu is taught as a compulsory subject up to higher secondary school in both English and Urdu medium school systems, which has produced millions of second-language Urdu speakers among people whose native language is one of the other languages of Pakistan – which in turn has led to the absorption of vocabulary from various regional Pakistani languages, while some Urdu vocabularies has also been assimilated by Pakistan's regional languages.

Punjabi

Punjabi (پنجابی) is an Indo-Aryan language primarily spoken in the Punjab province of Pakistan. Punjabi is the most widely spoken language in Pakistan. It is spoken as a first language by almost 39% of Pakistanis. It is the 11th most widely spoken language in India, and the third most-spoken native language in the Indian Subcontinent. The language is spoken among a significant overseas diaspora, particularly in Canada, the United States, and the United Kingdom. Punjabi is unusual among the Indo-Aryan languages and the broader Indo-European language family in its usage of lexical tone.

Pashto

Pashto (پښتو) is an Iranian language spoken as a first language by more than 18% of Pakistanis, mainly in Khyber Pakhtunkhwa and in northern Balochistan as well as in ethnic Pashtun communities in the cities of Islamabad, Rawalpindi, Lahore, and most notably Karachi, which may have the largest Pashtun population of any city in the world.

There are three major dialect patterns within which the various individual dialects may be classified; these are Pakhto, which is the Northern (Peshawar) variety, and the softer Pashto spoken in the southern areas such as in Quetta.

Sindhi

Sindhi (سنڌي) is an Indo-Aryan language spoken as a first language by almost 15% of Pakistanis, mostly in the Sindh province of Pakistan. The name "Sindhi" is derived from Sindhu, the original name of the Indus River.

Like other languages of this family, Sindhi has passed through Old Indo-Aryan (Sanskrit) and Middle Indo-Aryan (Pali, secondary Prakrits, and Apabhramsha) stages of growth. 20th century Western scholars such as George Abraham Grierson believed that Sindhi descended specifically from the Vrācaḍa dialect of Apabhramsha (described by Markandeya as being spoken in Sindhu-deśa) but later work has shown this to be unlikely. It entered the New Indo-Aryan stage around the 10th century CE.

Saraiki

Saraiki (سرائیکی) is an Indo-Aryan language of the Lahnda group, spoken in central and southeastern Pakistan, primarily in the southern part of the province of Punjab. Saraiki is to a high degree mutually intelligible with Standard Punjabi and shares with it a large portion of its vocabulary and morphology. At the same time in its phonology it is radically different (particularly in the lack of tones, the preservation of the voiced aspirates and the development of implosive consonants), and has important grammatical features in common with the Sindhi language spoken to the south.

Saraiki is the language of about 26 million people in Pakistan, ranging across southern Punjab, southern Khyber Pakhtunkhwa, and border regions of northern Sindh and eastern Balochistan.

Balochi

Balochi (بلوچی) is an Iranian language spoken as a first language by about 3% of Pakistanis, mostly in the Balochistan province. Rakshani is the major dialect group in terms of numbers. Sarhaddi is a sub-dialect of Rakshani. Other sub-dialects are Kalati (Qalati), Chagai-Kharani and Panjguri. Eastern Hill Balochi or Northern Balochi is very different from the rest.

Hindko 

Hindko (ہندکو) is a cover term for a diverse group of Lahnda dialects spoken in several discontinuous areas in northwestern Pakistan, primarily in the provinces of Khyber Pakhtunkhwa and Punjab.
Hindko is mutually intelligible with Punjabi and Saraiki, and has more affinities with the latter than with the former. Differences with other Punjabi varieties are more pronounced in the morphology and phonology than in the syntax.
The word Hindko, commonly used to refer to a number of Indo-Aryan dialects spoken in the neighbourhood of Pashto, likely originally meant "the Indian language" (in contrast to Pashto). An alternative local name for this language group is Hindki.

Brahui

Brahui (براھوی) is a Dravidian language spoken in the central part of Balochistan province. Brahui is spoken in the central part of Pakistani Balochistan, mainly in Kalat, Khuzdar and Mastung districts, but also in smaller numbers in neighbouring districts, as well as in Afghanistan which borders Pakistani Balochistan; however, many members of the ethnic group no longer speak Brahui.

Minor languages

Other languages spoken by linguistic minorities include the languages listed below, with speakers ranging from a few hundred to tens of thousands. A few are highly endangered languages that may soon have no speakers at all. The United Nations Educational, Scientific and Cultural Organization defines five levels of language endangerment between "safe" (not endangered) and "extinct":

 Vulnerable - "most children speak the language, but it may be restricted to certain domains (e.g., home)"
 Definitely endangered – "children no longer learn the language as mother tongue in the home"
 Severely endangered – "language is spoken by grandparents and older generations; while the parent generation may understand it, they do not speak it to children or among themselves"
 Critically endangered – "the youngest speakers are grandparents and older, and they speak the language partially and infrequently"
 Extinct – "there are no speakers left; included in the Atlas if presumably extinct since the 1950s"

The list below includes the findings from the third edition of Atlas of the World's Languages in Danger (2010; formerly the Red Book of Endangered Languages), as well as the online edition of the aforementioned publication, both published by UNESCO.

Religion

According to the World Factbook, Library of Congress, Oxford University, over 96% of the population of Pakistan is Muslim and the remaining 4% is Hindu, Christian, and others. Majority of the Muslims practice Sunni with a significant minority of Shi'as.

Nearly all Pakistani Sunni Muslims belong to the Hanafi school, although there are some Hanbalis and Ahl-e-Hadees. The majority of Shia Muslims belong to the Ithnā'Ashariyyah branch, while a smaller number practice Ismailism. There are small non-Muslim religious groups, including Christians, Ahmadis, Hindus, Buddhists, Sikhs, Baháʼís and Zoroastrians (Parsis),

The religious breakdown of the Pakistani population as of Pakistan Census 2017 is as follows:

 Muslims: 200,362,718
 Hindus: 4,444,870
 Christians: 2,642,048
 Ahmadiyya: 191,737
 All Others (including Zoroastrians, Sikhs, and Buddhists): 43,253

Recent changes and detailed demographic data 

Pakistan Bureau of Statistics released religious data of Pakistan Census 2017 on 19 May 2021. 96.47% are Muslims, followed by 2.14% Hindus, 1.27% Christians, 0.09% Ahmadis and 0.02% others.

These are some maps of religious minority groups. The 2017 census showed an increasing share in Hinduism, mainly caused by a higher birth rate among the impoverished Hindus of Sindh province. This census also recorded Pakistan's first Hindu-majority district, called Umerkot District, where Muslims were previously the majority.

On the other hand, Christianity in Pakistan, while increasing in raw numbers, has fallen significantly in percentage terms since the last census. This is due to Pakistani Christians having a significantly lower fertility rate than Pakistani Muslims and Pakistani Hindus as well as them being concentrated in the most developed parts of Pakistan, Lahore District (over 5% Christian), Islamabad Capital Territory (over 4% Christian), and Northern Punjab.

The Ahmadiyya movement shrunk in size (both raw numbers and percentage) between 1998 and 2017, while remaining concentrated in Lalian Tehsil, Chiniot District, where approximately 13% of the population is Ahmadiyya.

Pakistanis around the world

See also
 Overseas Pakistani
 Minorities in Pakistan
 Ethnic groups of Pakistan
 Languages of Pakistan
 Indo-Iranians

Notes

References

Sources

External links
 Pakistan Bureau of Statistics
 infopak.gov.pk – Ministry of Information and Broadcasting
 Population Reference Bureau
 statpak.gov.pk – Population by mother tongue
 US Census: International Data Base (IDB)